People who served as Judge Advocate of New South Wales are:

Notes

References

Judge Advocate of New South Wales